Canadian singer Justin Bieber has starred in over 105 music videos, 13 films, and has made 24 appearances in various television series. For his debut extended play My World (2009), Bieber released music videos for the singles "One Time", "One Less Lonely Girl", and "Love Me". Bieber released his debut studio-album, My World 2.0 (2010), which produced the hit single "Baby" featuring Ludacris. It broke the Guinness World Record for being the most popular video of any kind online and propelled Bieber to global stardom. As of January 2023, it has accumulated over 2.9 billion views and 23 million likes on YouTube. Both albums were featured in Bieber's first concert film, Justin Bieber: Never Say Never, which became the highest-grossing concert/performance film of all-time at the global box office, with earnings exceeding $99 million. Based on initial tracking, it became the highest-grossing concert movie in the United States since 1984 and the third-highest-grossing documentary since 1982.

Bieber released a Christmas-themed second studio-album, Under the Mistletoe (2011), which included music videos for various singles including "Mistletoe". He went on to release his third studio-album, Believe (2012), exploring a more mature style of music and appeal. The music video for "Boyfriend", the album's lead single, set a Vevo record for the most views in a 24-hour period, with over eight million. Believe also produced the hit singles "As Long as You Love Me" and "Beauty and a Beat", and their respective music videos; the latter of which was co-directed by Bieber. The album was featured in Bieber's second concert film, Justin Bieber's Believe. 

Following two turbulent years, Bieber made his return with "Where Are Ü Now", a collaboration with Jack Ü. Its music video received four nominations at the 2015 MTV Video Music Awards and won the MTV Video Music Award for Best Visual Effects. The song's musical direction inspired Bieber's fourth studio-album, Purpose (2015), which produced the worldwide hit singles "What Do You Mean?", "Sorry", and "Love Yourself". The music video for "Sorry" has amassed over 3.6 billion views on YouTube, his most-viewed video to-date. It was nominated for Video of the Year at the 2016 MTV Video Music Awards and 2016 American Music Awards, winning in the latter. The album featured "a series of video vignettes" for each track on its standard edition titled Purpose: The Movement. Between 2016 and 2017, Bieber diversified on numerous commercially successful collaborations with accompanying music videos, including "Cold Water", "Let Me Love You", "Despacito Remix", "I'm the One", "2U", and "Friends". The music video for "I'm the One", was nominated for Best Hip Hop Video at the 2017 MTV Video Music Awards and Best Music Video at the 2018 iHeartRadio Music Awards, winning in the latter. In 2019, Bieber released "I Don't Care" and "10,000 Hours", both of which attained international success. "I Don't Care" was nominated for Best Music Video at the 2020 iHeartRadio Music Awards, while "10,000 Hours" was nominated for Video of the Year at the 55th Academy of Country Music Awards. 

Bieber released his fifth studio-album, Changes (2020), which spawned the hit singles "Yummy" and "Intentions", with the former being nominated for Best Music Video at the 2021 iHeartRadio Music Awards. Changes followed its predecessor in featuring accompanying music videos for all album tracks titled Changes: The Movement. Bieber also released a 10-part YouTube Originals docu-series, Justin Bieber: Seasons, which focused on an array of themes: his life post-hiatus from music, marriage, preparation for new music, and battle against Lyme disease. The docu-series amassed 32.65 million views within its first week of release, breaking the record for the most-viewed premiere in its first week of all YouTube Originals. The same year, Bieber released a duet with Ariana Grande, "Stuck with U", which won the award for Best Music Video From Home at the 2020 MTV Video Music Awards. Bieber starred in DJ Khaled's music video for "Popstar", which received nominations for Video of the Year and Best Direction at the 2021 MTV Video Music Awards. The following year Bieber released his highly anticipated sixth studio-album, Justice (2021), which became an international success and produced various hit singles including "Holy", "Lonely", "Anyone", "Hold On", "Peaches", and "Ghost". At the 2021 MTV Video Music Awards, "Holy" and "Peaches" were nominated for Best Cinematography and Best Editing, respectively. The music video for "Peaches" was also nominated for the Best Music Video at the 64th Annual Grammy Awards and Best Video at the 2021 MTV Europe Music Awards and 2022 iHeartRadio Music Awards, respectively. Bieber also released a documentary film titled Justin Bieber: Our World that delves into his personal life and performative preparations towards his 2020 New Year's Eve show on the rooftop of the Beverly Hilton hotel. The film was nominated for Best Music Film at the 65th Annual Grammy Awards. The same year, Bieber collaborated with The Kid Laroi on "Stay", which became an international hit and its music video was nominated for Best Visual Effects at the 2022 MTV Video Music Awards and Best Music Video at the 2022 iHeartRadio Music Awards, respectively. Bieber went on to perform a virtual interactive live show titled "Live in the Metaverse" in collaboration with Wave, which received nominations for Best Metaverse Performance at the 2022 MTV Europe Music Awards and 2022 MTV Video Music Awards, respectively.

Overall, 11 music videos by Bieber have surpassed over 1 billion views on YouTube (second most of all-time), his most recent being "Beauty and a Beat". His YouTube channel is currently the most viewed music channel for an individual on the platform, having attracted over 29.5 billion views. With over 70 million subscribers, he remains the most subscribed solo artist on YouTube and held the overall record for six years.

Music videos

Filmography

Television

Commercials

References

External links
 Justin Bieber's official Vevo channel on YouTube
 Videography of Justin Bieber at MTV
 [ Discography and videography of Justin Bieber] at Allmusic

Videography
Canadian filmographies
Male actor filmographies
Videographies of Canadian artists